The Henry Farman HF.19 was a French reconnaissance seaplane developed by Henry Farman before World War I. As a floatplane, it used floats for take-off and landing on water.

Specifications

References

Further reading
 

 

Biplanes
Single-engined pusher aircraft
HF.19
Canard aircraft